Chersky (masculine), Cherskaya (feminine), or Cherskoye (neuter) is the name of several inhabited localities in Russia:
Chersky (urban-type settlement), an urban locality (an urban-type settlement) in Nizhnekolymsky District of the Sakha Republic
Cherskaya, a rural locality (a village) in Palkinsky District of Pskov Oblast